Tommy Plumain (born 12 January 2001) is a French professional footballer who plays as a goalkeeper for Championnat National club Châteauroux.

Career
Plumain made his professional debut with Châteauroux in a 1–0 Ligue 2 loss to Paris FC on 20 February 2021.

References

External links
 

2001 births
Living people
French footballers
Guadeloupean footballers
Association football goalkeepers
LB Châteauroux players
Ligue 2 players
Championnat National 3 players